Kochkhyur is a rural locality (a selo) and the administrative centre of Kochkhyursky Selsoviet, Kurakhsky District, Republic of Dagestan, Russia. The population was 806 as of 2010.

Nationalities 
Lezgins live there.

Geography
Kochkhyur is located 16 km southeast from Kurakh (the district's administrative centre) by road. Shtul and Kutul are the nearest rural localities.

References 

Rural localities in Kurakhsky District